The rufous-rumped seedeater (Sporophila hypochroma), also known as the grey-and-chestnut seedeater, is a species of bird in the family Thraupidae. It breeds in southern Paraguay, Argentina, and Uruguay. It migrates northward to Bolivia, the Pantanal and central Brazil. Its natural habitats are dry savanna, subtropical or tropical seasonally wet or flooded lowland grassland, and pastureland.  It is threatened by habitat loss.

References

rufous-rumped seedeater
Birds of Paraguay
Birds of Argentina
rufous-rumped seedeater
rufous-rumped seedeater
Taxonomy articles created by Polbot